Dihammaphora cylindricollis is a species of beetle in the family Cerambycidae. It was described by Chemsak and Noguera in 1993.

References

Dihammaphora
Beetles described in 1993